Antonio Pedrero López (born 23 October 1991 in Terrassa) is a Spanish cyclist, who currently rides for UCI WorldTeam . He was named in the startlist for the 2017 Vuelta a España. In May 2018, he was named in the startlist for the 2018 Giro d'Italia.

Major results

2014
 1st  Overall Vuelta a Navarra
1st Stage 1
2015
 3rd Overall Tour de Guadeloupe
1st Stage 9
2016
 10th Circuito de Getxo
 10th Overall Tour de l'Ain
2018
 8th Overall Vuelta a Asturias
2019
 4th Overall Vuelta a Burgos
 6th Prueba Villafranca de Ordizia
2021
 1st  Overall Route d'Occitanie
1st Stage 3
 2nd Overall Vuelta a Asturias
 8th Coppa Sabatini
2022
 5th Overall Tour de l'Ain
1st Stage 3
 5th Overall Vuelta a Asturias
 6th Prueba Villafranca de Ordizia
 8th Overall Deutschland Tour

Grand Tour general classification results timeline

References

External links

1991 births
Living people
Spanish male cyclists
Cyclists from Catalonia
Sportspeople from Terrassa
21st-century Spanish people